This is a complete List of Algerian football players in foreign leagues, i.e. association football players who have played in foreign leagues.

For most of the twentieth century, most Algeria internationals played in the native Algerian Ligue Professionnelle 1; however, the national team has included some players based abroad from the beginning. While some in the 1960s and 1970s played for Algerian clubs, for example Hacène Lalmas and Mokhtar Khalem at CR Belcourt, others played in France, such as Sadek Boukhalfa with Nantes or Mustapha Zitouni with AS Monaco. Seven players of the squad for the 1982 FIFA World Cup came from a foreign club: Abdelmajid Bourebbou (Stade Lavallois), Mustapha Dahleb (Paris SG), Djamel Tlemcani (Stade de Reims), Djamel Zidane (KV Kortrijk), Karim Maroc (FC Tours), Faouzi Mansouri (Montpellier HSC) and Nourredine Kourichi (Girondins Bordeaux). By the time of the 1986 World Cup that number had increased to 11 (50% of the squad), and at the 2010 and 2014 tournaments almost all were playing abroad (there were three and two home-based players respectively in the 23-man squads).

The history of Algerian players in Europe

A Large number of Algerian players have played in Europe as especially in France, the former colonial ruler of Algeria. The first Algerian player in Europe and first North African to play in France was Ali Benouna who joined Sète in 1930. He is the first Algerian player to win a European title, having won the French league and Coupe de France of the 1933–34 season with Sète. Benouna paved the way for more Algerians to soon taste the success of the French championship. This was done by Abdelkader Ben Bouali in the colors of Olympique de Marseille in the 1936–37 season, then Mohamed Firoud and Abdelaziz Ben Tifour on two consecutive occasions with Nice in 1950–51 and 1951–52, in addition to Rachid Mekhloufi in 1956–57 with Saint Etienne and Mohamed Maouche in the next season with Stade de Reims;  all these titles came in the colonial era. As for the first player to win a title outside France, Mekhloufi holds that accolade for winning the Swiss League in 1962.

In relation to statistics, the most prominent of these are Rachid Mekhloufi, star of AS Saint-Étienne who scored 150 goals and won the league title four times. There is also Mustapha Dahleb, former star for Paris Saint-Germain where he achieved two Coupe de France victories and is one of the most popular players in the history of the club (310 matches and 98 goals in 10 seasons). Rabah Madjer was perhaps the best Algerian player to turn professional in Europe; he claimed ten trophies with FC Porto: three League, two Cup and two Super Cup on the domestic level and two continental titles on the level, including the European Cup in 1987 becoming the first Algerian and an African player to achieve this feat, and the Intercontinental Cup in Japan against Peñarol from Uruguay in which he scored the winning goal. In the 1970s and 1980s, Algerian players were generally not allowed to play professionally until they were over 28 years old which deprived many of the stars of the Algerian team at the time of a top-level career, especially after the 1982 FIFA World Cup, including Mehdi Cerbah, Hocine Yahi, Chaabane Merzekane, Fodil Megharia, Hacène Lalmas, Mahmoud Guendouz, Ali Bencheikh, Ali Fergani, Lakhdar Belloumi, Djamel Menad, Tedj Bensaoula and Omar Betrouni; some of them did play professionally but did not achieve much success because of their advancing age. There were some players allowed to moved abroad even though they had not reached the age of 28: Djamel Zidane, Rabah Madjer and Salah Assad.

Several other players have achieved prominent titles: Rafik Djebbour won eight titles, four League and 4 in the cu, followed by El Arbi Hillel Soudani with 7 titles including three league and three cup, then Madjid Bougherra who won six trophies with Glasgow Rangers. Ahmed Reda Madouni was the first Algerian Bundesliga champion in the colours of Borussia Dortmund in the 2001–02 season (subsequently his career involved a strange fluctuation). in Eastern Europe, Selim Bouadla was crowned Hungarian league winner with Debrecen twice in the 2011–12 and 2013–14 season, noting that La Liga and Serie A has not tasted the taste of any Algerian player so far and the nearest thing was the Runner-up in Serie A by Djamel Mesbah in 2012 and Faouzi Ghoulam in 2016. The English Premier League, was won by Riyad Mahrez with Leicester City. the 2012–13 season is considered the best for Algerian players, where they won 12 titles including three league, seven cups, three Super Cup and one league cup achieved by seven players are Djebbour, Soudani, Abdoun, Ghoulam, Rani, Sayoud and Benzia, In 2018–19, Riyad Mahrez achieved the English treble with Manchester City as the first Algerian to achieve this achievement. In the 2017–18 season, 161 Algerian players (including those of the diaspora who represent the national team) featured across all the leagues in Europe, and were present in 31 of the 55 leagues.

At the level of individual titles Mahrez won the 2016 PFA Players' Player of the Year award. He was the first African to earn the accolade. There is also Ali Benarbia achieved the best player award in the French league with Girondins de Bordeaux. Sofiane Hanni also won the best player award. in the Belgian league with Mechelen as the first Algerian player achieves this award, El Arabi Hillel Soudani also with Dinamo Zagreb he won his first trophy in Croatia as the best player in the Prva liga after a vote of all the captains of the Prva liga Croatian clubs. as for at the level scorers There are only two Algerian players have achieved the title of top scorer of the league is in Europe, namely Ahmed Oudjani in the French league and Jabbour in Greek league and there are also Madjer, who won the title top scorer in the European Cup 1987–88 season. as for Makhloufi is considered the best Algerian scorer in Europe with 170 goal, including 156 in the league, followed by Djebbour 132 goal which 110 in the league comes after Dahleb 115 goal, including 102 in the league. as for more than play games just in the leagues there Rachid Mekhloufi with 360 games, Abdelkader Ferhaoui 343, Ryad Boudebouz by 328, Mustapha Dahleb by 321 and finally Mohamed Salem 308 games. on the other hand more than hat-tricks record is Makhloufi 9 all hat-tricks with Saint-Étienne then Madjer by 5 and finally Ahmed Oudjani and El Arbi Hillel Soudani by 4 hat-tricks.

At the level of countries have made Algerians players 61 title in France which is sixteen league, twenty five cup, nine Coupe de la Ligue and eleven Trophée des Champions after that Luxembourg twenty title, fourteen League and six cups and finally Scotland thirteen title, five Premiership, four Cup and four League Cup. Other countries where the Algerians players at least won one title is the 17th state in the following figure Azerbaijan, Belgium, Bulgaria, Croatia, Cyprus, England, Finland, Germany, Greece, Hungary, Italy, Northern Ireland, Portugal, Romania, Switzerland, Czechoslovak and Turkey. the beginning of sparkling Algerian national team in 2009 began Algerian players Shares rise in Europe, such as El Arbi Hillel Soudani, who moved from ASO Chlef to Vitória Guimarães from Portugal. There are also Islam Slimani from CR Belouizdad to Sporting CP and then moved to Leicester City as the most expensive transfer deal for Algerian player in the history, The transfer fee paid to Sporting was reported as £28 million, a club record for Leicester. also there is the Paradou AC/JMG "El Ankaoui" Academy, which graduated many players to Europe and they are Ramy Bensebaini, Youcef Attal, Haithem Loucif, Farid El Mellali and Hicham Boudaoui who became the most expensive Algerian player has moved from an Algerian club to Europe with 4,000,000 euros.

Gallery

Algerian descent players played for other national teams 

Due to Algeria's historic ties with France, there have been a number of Algerian players playing professionally in the French leagues, while the French national team has included players of Algerian heritage, most notably Zinedine Zidane, Karim Benzema and Samir Nasri.

Zinedine Yazid Zidane was born on 23 June 1972 in La Castellane, Marseille, in Southern France. Zidane is of Algerian Kabyle descent. His parents, Smaïl and Malika, emigrated to Paris from the village of Aguemoune in the Berber-speaking region of Kabylie in northern Algeria in 1953 before the start of the Algerian War. The family, which had settled in the city's tough northern districts of Barbès and Saint-Denis, found little work in the region
Karim Benzema was born in the city of Lyon, France, to French nationals of Algerian descent. As a practicing Muslim, he observes fasting during the Islamic holy month of Ramadan. His grandfather, Da Lakehal Benzema, lived in the village of Tigzirt, located in the northern town of Beni Djellil in Algeria before migrating to Lyon, where he eventually settled in the 1950s. Benzema's father, Hafid, was born in Tigzirt, while his mother, Wahida Djebbara, was born and raised in Lyon; her family originated from Oran. Benzema is the third youngest in the family and grew up with eight other siblings in Bron, an eastern suburb of Lyon. His younger brothers Gressy and Sabri are also footballers. The former currently plies his trade at the amateur level with Vaulx-le-Velin in the Division d'Honneur, the sixth division of French football, while the latter plays in the youth academy of a club in the family's hometown of Bron.
Samir Nasri was born in Septèmes-les-Vallons, a northern suburb of Marseille, to French nationals of Algerian descent. His mother, Ouassila Ben Saïd, and father, Abdelhafid Nasri, were both born in France; his father being born and raised in Marseille, while his mother being from nearby Salon-de-Provence. Nasri's grandparents emigrated to France from Algeria. His mother is a housewife and his father previously worked as a bus driver before becoming his son's personal manager. At the start of his football career, Nasri initially played under his mother's surname, Ben Saïd, before switching to Nasri, his father's surname, following his selection to the France under-16 team. He is the eldest of four children and is a non-practising Muslim.
Nabil Fekir Having earned one cap at under-21 level for his native France, Fekir had been named in his ancestral Algeria's squad for friendlies against Oman and Qatar in March 2015. However, he withdrew to take part in the French squad for friendlies against Brazil and Denmark. He made his debut on 26 March against the former at the Stade de France, replacing Antoine Griezmann for the final 16 minutes of a 1–3 defeat. He scored his first goal on 7 June, concluding a 3–4 home friendly defeat to Belgium. On 4 September, in a 1–0 away friendly win over Portugal, he ruptured three ligaments in his right knee, putting him out for an estimated six months.
Karim Boudiaf was born in France, and is of Moroccan-Algerian descent. On December 22, 2009, Boudiaf was called up to the Algeria Under-23 national team for a training camp in Algiers. Boudiaf acquired Qatari nationality and was called up to the Qatar national football team on November 13, 2013. He was capped in an unofficial friendly exhibition match against Saudi club Al Hilal. He made his official debut for the team on 25 December in the 2014 WAFF Championship in a 1–0 win against Palestine.
Boualem Khoukhi was born and raised in Algeria. On November 9, 2010, Khoukhi was called up for the first time to the Algeria under–23 national team for a pair of friendlies against Tunisia. The Qatar Football Association attempted to naturalize Khoukhi shortly after he arrived in Qatar, however, he refused and claimed that he would not be naturalized for any amount of money. He stated his desire was to play with the Algeria senior national team. Subsequently, he received Qatari citizenship in order to assist in his club's foreign player quota. Despite his call up to Algeria's olympic team, he was called up to the Qatar B team on November 13, 2013 by compatriot Djamel Belmadi. When questioned about Khoukhi's call-up to the squad, Belmadi claimed that Khoukhi was naturalized prior to his call-up in order for his team, Al Arabi, to overcome the foreign player quota. Belmadi stated he was surprised when the QFA revealed Khoukhi was eligible to be called up to the Qatar national team. He made his official debut for the team on December 25 in the 2014 WAFF Championship in a 1–0 win against Palestine.

Houssem Aouar is eligible to feature for Algeria despite playing for the French youth teams at the U17 and U21 levels. In 2018, he was reported considering to represent Algeria at international level following a talk with former Lyon and current Real Madrid striker Karim Benzema. In January 2019, manager of Algeria Djamel Belmadi confirmed that he would visit Aouar and present the vision and project of the Desert Foxes in hope of convincing him to play in the upcoming Africa Cup of Nations. On 26 August 2020, Aouar received his first call-up for France to prepare for 2020–21 UEFA Nations League matches against Sweden and Croatia in early September. He made his debut on 7 October 2020 in a friendly against Ukraine. After years of back and forth rumours on his nationality change, on January 6th, 2023, Aouar changed international allegiance to his parent's home nation of Algeria.

European League
 Armenia 

 Azerbaijan 

 Belgium 

 Bulgaria 

 Czech Republic 

 Croatia 

 Cyprus 

 Denmark 

 England 

 Finland 

 France 

 Germany 

 Greece 

 Georgia 

 Hungary 

 Iceland 

 Italy 

 Kosovo 

 Luxembourg 

 Lithuania 

 Macedonia 

 Malta 

 Netherlands 

 Northern Ireland 

 Norway 

 Poland 

 Portugal 

 Romania 

 Russia 

 Scotland 

 Slovakia 

 Spain 

 Sweden 

 Switzerland 

 Turkey 

 Ukraine

List All-time top appearances in european League

Correct as of 23 May 2022 (UTC)

List All-time top goalscorers in european Leagues

Algerian players and European Competitions
Bold Still playing competitive football in Europe

1 Includes the UEFA Cup Winners' Cup and UEFA Europa Conference League.

Correct as of 5 May 2022 (UTC)

List All-time top goalscorers for the Algerian players in european Competitions
Bold Still playing competitive football in Europe

Correct as of 5 May 2022 (UTC)

List of Algerian players hat-tricks in european League
Position key:
GK – Goalkeeper;
DF – Defender;
MF – Midfielder;
FW – Forward;
4 – Player scored four goals;
6 – Player scored six goals;
* – The home team

List of Algerian players hat-tricks in UEFA competitions

Multiple hat-tricks

By Leagues

List All-time top goalscorers in All european Competitions

Algerian players Titles in European clubs
This statistics of Algerian players who won titles in Europe where the player must be Algerian whether he played for the Algeria national football team or from an Algerian father and mother. He has never been represent another country, but if he plays for another national team and then plays for the Algeria team he is considered an Algerian player, and the same thing if he played with teams Under-23, Under-20 and Under-17.
 
Bold Still playing competitive football in Europe

Summary UEFA

List by League UEFA

List by Cup UEFA

List by League Cup UEFA

List by Super Cup UEFA

List by intercontinental Cup UEFA

List of Algerian players achieved triplets or more

Individual Honours

List Top goalscorers Algerian players in europe

Algerian players of the Year in European  Leagues

Most expensive transfers in the history of Algerian players 

Mustapha Dahleb arrived in Paris Saint Germain in 1974, coached by Just Fontaine, the president of the club Daniel Hechter recruited him for 1.35 million francs, record amount for a transfer to France at the time. there is also Moussa Saïb who moved from Auxerre to Valencia with 3,600,000 euros in 1997 in a historic deal for an Algerian player then. In 1998, he joined struggling English club Tottenham for £2.3 million, thus becoming the first Algerian to play in the Premier League. In 2016, Islam Slimani moved into a historic deal for English Premier League champions Leicester City for 28 million pounds to become the most expensive player in the history of Algeria. two years later Riyad Mahrez become the most expensive transfer deal for an Algerian player moved to English Premier League champions Manchester City for 60 million pounds. and also become the most expensive African footballer after he broke the record for Gabonese Pierre-Emerick Aubameyang with £56.1 in 2018 winter transfer window. in the same time most expensive transfer deal for Manchester City and a record transfer fee received by Leicester City.
As of 4 August 2019; during the 2019 summer transfer window.

History of Algerian players in the rest of the world Leagues

Algerian players have played in all continents, most of them in Arab leagues in Africa and Asia, especially in the Persian Gulf, and Nadir Belhadj is the most successful player. played 214 matches in six seasons with the Qatari club Al-Sadd, and 43 matches in two seasons with Al-Sailiya. during which he won 5 titles including the AFC Champions League and participated in the FIFA Club World Cup. the first Algerian to Participates in this competition is Moussa Saïb with Al-Nassr in 2000 and scored one goal, At the level of titles Algerian players won 90 titles in twelve countries, namely Bahrain, Canada, Egypt, Kuwait, Mexico, Morocco, Saudi Arabia, Singapore, Thailand, United Arab Emirates and Tunisia the country where Algerian players have won the highest number of titles with 36, followed by Qatar with 23 titles. and more player won titles is Baghdad Bounedjah with seven, On the level of local league, Youcef Belaïli won with Espérance ST four league championships more than any other Algerian player. in 2010 witnessed the achievement of four Algerian players S.League and League Cup in Singapore, they are Khaled Kharroubi, Karim Boudjema, Nordine Talhi and Mansour Lakehal which has never happened before, The two brothers Mustapha and Abdelaziz Ben Tifour, first who won title outside Algeria by winning the Tunisian Cup twice in 1947 and 1948.

At the level of continental titles and start in Africa, where the Algerian players won eight titles in CAF Champions League, CAF Confederation Cup and CAF Super Cup, mostly with Tunisian clubs and the first to win the continental title is the international goalkeeper Nacerdine Drid with Moroccan club Raja Casablanca in 1989 led by Algerian coach Rabah Saâdane. On 9 November 2018, Twenty-two years later, Youcef Belaïli won the CAF Champions League and for the first time in its new version after winning the final against Al-Ahly, he is the fourth Algerian player to win this title. On the level of Asia, Nadir Belhadj won the AFC Champions League title for the first time for an Algerian player in 2011 and scored the decisive penalty kick.

The transfers of Algerian players in the rest of the world Leagues and the most prominent, Khaled Kharroubi is the first Algerian to play in South America and exactly in Brazil with Vitória where he played for one season. Aymen Tahar is the first Algerian to play in the J1 League, but has played only one match. also Karim Matmour is the first Algerian to play in Australia A-League where he joined to Adelaide United, but he left in December 2017, terminating his contract early after playing 11 games. Raïs M'Bolhi is also the first Algerian to play in Major League Soccer with a club Philadelphia Union. After playing in only 9 matches in the 2015 season, head coach, Jim Curtin said that M'Bolhi would never play again for Philadelphia. M'Bohli is rated as one of the worst signings in club history., On 22 January 2018, Saphir Taïder signed a three-year deal at Major League Soccer franchise Montreal Impact, starting with a two-year loan and the option of a fourth year. He joined as a Designated Player. and the first goal for an Algerian player in MLS was against Atlanta United FC in a 4–1 defeat away. in Africa, Farès Hachi is the first Algerian to play in South Africa when he joined African champion Mamelodi Sundowns. but played only 21 game in the Premier Soccer League in a season and a half and then left South Africa.

Also there is the French-born Chaher Zarour who spent the Vietnam League 1 with Sanna Khánh Hòa as the first Algerian player to play there. The first player to play in South Asia was Hamid Berguiga, when he joined Brunei DPMM in Brunei, who plays in the Singapore league and won the League Cup in 2009 first in this region for an Algerian player. In North America, Andy Delort became the first Algerian to win a title there with Mexican club Tigres UANL where Delort won Liga MX Apertura in 2016, although he did not have Algerian citizenship until 2019. Also his transfer deal was the highest for an Algerian player outside Europe where he signed a four-year contract while the transfer fee paid to Caen was reported as €8 million. Three years after Saphir Taïder achieved the Canadian Championship with Montreal Impact after winning against Toronto FC in the final first for an Algerian player.

On the level of statistics and awards, Algerian players won the top scorer in eight times, most notably Bounedjah four times one in Tunisia with Etoile du Sahel and three with Al-Sadd and is considered the same player the most recorded hat-tricks with thirteen. Bounedjah also won the CAF Confederation Cup top scorer with Etoile du Sahel in 2015. On 12 August 2018, Bounedjah broke the Qatar Stars League single-game goal record, scoring 7 goals in a 10–1 win against Al Arabi., Bounedjah continued his success at the individual level by winning the top scorer of the 2018 AFC Champions League with 13 goals to become the first Algerian and the first player from a Qatari club to achieve this award, The Al-Sadd forward matched the all-time single tournament record held by Muriqui who netted the same tally by the conclusion of Guangzhou Evergrande's 2013 campaign. On 7 December 2018, Bounedjah beats Qatar goal record with 28 goals after just 14 matches, He broke the record held by Brazilian striker Clemerson de Araújo, who scored 27 goals in 2007–08. On 23 February 2019, Bounedjah scored in the Qatari classico against Al-Rayyan his 100 goal in all leagues competitions to become the first Algerian player to reach him With one club outside Europe. After changing the laws in Tunisia and considering the players from North Africa local a large number of Algerian players Join the Tunisian Ligue Professionnelle 1.

Rest of the world Leagues
 Australia 

 Bahrain 

 Canada 

 Canada/United States 

 China PR 

 Egypt 

 Iran 

 Iraq 

 Kuwait 

 Libya 

 Mexico 

 Morocco 

 Qatar 

 Japan 

 Jordan 

 Saudi Arabia 

 Singapore 

 Sudan 

 Thailand 

 United Arab Emirates 

 Réunion 

 Tunisia 

 Vietnam 

 South Africa

League statistics rest of the world

Algerian players in the rest of the world intercontinental Competitions
Bold Still playing competitive football in the rest of the world

1 Includes the CAF Champions League, CONCACAF Champions League and AFC Champions League.
2 Includes the CAF Confederation Cup and AFC Cup.
3 Includes the CAF Super Cup and FIFA Club World Cup.

List All-time top goalscorers in the rest of the world intercontinental Competitions

1 Includes the CAF Champions League and AFC Champions League.
2 Includes the CAF Confederation Cup and AFC Cup.
3 Includes the CAF Super Cup and FIFA Club World Cup.

List of Algerian players hat-tricks in the rest of the world Leagues
Position key:
GK – Goalkeeper;
DF – Defender;
MF – Midfielder;
FW – Forward;
4 – Player scored four goals;
5 – Player scored five goals;
7 – Player scored seven goals;
* – The home team

List of Algerian players hat-tricks in intercontinental competitions

Multiple hat-tricks

By Leagues

List All-time top goalscorers in All the rest of the world Competitions

Algerian players Titles In the rest of the world clubs
Bold Still playing competitive football In the rest of the world League

Summary

List by League

List by Cup

List by League Cup

List by Super Cup

List by intercontinental Cup in rest of the world

List Top goalscorers Algerian players In the rest of the world

See also
:Category:Algeria international footballers

Notes

 Czechoslovakia (TCH, 1918–1992) split into the Czech Republic (CZE, 1993–present) and Slovakia (SVK, 1993–present).

References

External links 
 the Algerians in Europe at fariqelwatani.unblog.fr

Football players in foreign leagues
Algerians in foreign leagues
Algeria
Association football player non-biographical articles